The 1996 ITC Magny-Cours round was the ninth round of the 1996 International Touring Car Championship season. It took place on 15 September at the Circuit de Nevers Magny-Cours.

Alessandro Nannini won both races, driving an Alfa Romeo 155 V6 TI.

Classification

Qualifying

Race 1

Notes:
 – Gabriele Tarquini was given a 35-second penalty for causing a collision with Yannick Dalmas.

Race 2

Standings after the event

Drivers' Championship standings

Manufacturers' Championship standings

 Note: Only the top five positions are included for both sets of drivers' standings.

References

External links
Deutsche Tourenwagen Masters official website

1996 International Touring Car Championship season